An ice cream social (also known as an ice cream party) is a planned event, the primary focus of which is ice cream served to the guests. It is often a neighborhood event or welcoming party, normally held during the summer.

History
Ice cream socials are a traditional gathering, dating back to the 18th century in North America. The first one recorded in America was in 1744, when Maryland governor Thomas Bladen served ice cream for a dinner party. The first one in the White House was in 1802, with the 3rd U.S. president, Thomas Jefferson. When ice cream became more available to the public in the 1800s, organizations such as schools and churches started hosting them. Commencing in the 1860s, church events were often fashioned after the "ice cream gardens" common in society at the time. Today, they still take place in governmental and upper class circles and have spread to all classes and many types of organization with the increased popularity and availability of ice cream. 

Ice cream socials have expanded into elaborate affairs with many other ingredients and activities planned around it. Various online guides have sprouted up to assist planners.

The world's largest ice cream social was held on January 30, 2019 in Italy.

See also

 Ice cream
Party

References

Ice cream
Parties